Henadz Laptseu (born ) is a Belarusian weightlifter, and European Champion competing in the 62 kg category until 2018 and 61 kg starting in 2018 after the International Weightlifting Federation reorganized the categories.

Career
In 2019 he competed at the 2019 European Weightlifting Championships in the 61 kg division, winning a gold medal in the snatch and total, his total of 286 kg was 3 kg more than silver medalist Bünyamin Sezer.

Major results

References

1998 births
Living people
Belarusian male weightlifters
European Weightlifting Championships medalists
Sportspeople from Vitebsk Region
21st-century Belarusian people